The 2010 AFL season was the Collingwood Football Club's, (The Magpies), 114th season playing Australian rules football in the Victorian or Australian Football League. It was the club's most successful season since 1930 and the club's most successful season in AFL era. The Magpies won the premiership after defeating  by 56 points in the Grand Final Replay. Collingwood also won the McClelland Trophy for finishing first at the end of the home and away season. 2010 marked the first time that Collingwood won 20 matches in the same season, their first McClelland Trophy since 1970 and ended a 19-season premiership drought dating back to 1990.

Season results

Pre-season

NAB Cup

NAB Challenge

Regular home and away season

Finals series

Ladder

References

Collingwood Football Club
2010
Collingwood Football Club